"Escaping" is the debut solo single of New Zealand singer Margaret Urlich. The song charted at number one for three weeks in the New Zealand singles chart, later reaching number 17 in Australia. The song is the opening track on Urlich's debut album Safety in Numbers, and also features on her 1994 live album Live.

Awards 
At the 1989 New Zealand Music Awards, "Escaping" won Single of the Year. At the same awards, Urlich won Best Female Vocalist, and her debut album Safety in Numbers won Album of the Year and Best Cover Design.

Track listings 

7-inch single
 "Escaping" – 4:36
 "God Bless This Child" – 3:55

12-inch and CD single
 "Escaping" – 4:36
  "Your Love" – 4:30
 "God Bless This Child" – 3:55

Charts

Weekly charts

Year-end charts

Asia Blue version 

British female soul trio Asia Blue released a cover of the song as their debut single in 1992. Their version was produced by Barry Blue, who had originally written the song. The single peaked at number 50 in the UK in June 1992, becoming the group's biggest hit. The trio released two more singles, "Connect" and "Boy in the Moon" (another song originally done by Margaret Urlich) in 1992 and 1993 respectively, which failed to chart inside the UK top 75. A 10-track album titled Escaping was recorded and set to be released in early 1993, but due to the singles' lack of success it was shelved by the label.

Critical reception 
Pan-European magazine Music & Media wrote in their review that "this female vocal trio excels with a soulful ballad including a virtually classic chorus reminiscent of Donna Summer's State of Independence." Miranda Sawyer from Select noted its "gloriously syrupy chorus that would do Quincy Jones proud. 'Escaping' slicks and smooches in creditable En Vogue style."

Track listings 

7-inch single
 "Escaping" (Cool Blue Mix) - 4:46
 "I Want The Right (To Be Wrong)" - 4:07

12-inch single
 "Escaping" (A Kiss Across The Sea Mix) - 6:07
 "Escaping" (Sleeping Giant Mix) - 5:32
 "I Want The Right (To Be Wrong)" - 4:07

CD single
 "Escaping" (Cool Blue Mix) - 4:46
 "Escaping" (A Kiss Across The Sea Mix) - 6:07
 "Escaping" (Sleeping Giant Mix) - 5:32
 "I Want The Right (To Be Wrong)" - 4:07

Charts

Dina Carroll version 

British singer Dina Carroll released a cover of the song on 16 September 1996. For her version, Carroll and producer Nigel Lowis rewrote a good part of the original lyrics, but maintained the same musical structure of the previous versions. The video clip heavily featured a documentary of Balinese people culture and social life.

Her first single after a three-year absence, "Escaping" became Carroll's highest charting hit in the UK, peaking at No. 3, equalling the position of her ballad "Don't Be a Stranger". The B-side, "Mind Body & Soul" was a dance track that topped the UK Dance Chart.

Critical reception 
Jon O'Brien from AllMusic described "Escaping" as a "joint, worldbeat-inspired" song. A reviewer from Evening Herald stated that Carroll "certainly knows how to make a comeback in style". Ross Jones from The Guardian complimented its chorus as "massive" and noted how the "life-affirming refrain sweeps up to the heavens". Pan-European magazine Music & Media wrote, "...Dina Caroll is already receiving airplay with this cover version of the Asia Blue song. Don't expect R&B: this is a well-produced velvety gospel ballad." Music Week rated it three out of five, declaring it "an atmospheric, lushly-arranged ballad, complete with an African feel and touches of Estefan." The magazine's Alan Jones noted that this "strong mid-tempo cut with a soaring chorus" is already a radio favourite, "which should give her a triumphant return to the upper echelons of the chart."

Track listings 
UK CD single
 "Escaping"
 "Escaping" (DARC by Nature remix)
 "Mind Body & Soul" (Chicago MVP's Allstar mix)
 "Mind Body & Soul" (Jere McAllister Final's remix)

UK cassette single and European CD single
 "Escaping" (radio edit)
 "Escaping" (DARC by Nature remix)

Charts

Weekly charts

Year-end charts

References

External links 
 1989 original version by Margaret Urlich (YouTube)
 1992 cover by Asia Blue (YouTube)

1989 debut singles
1989 songs
1990s ballads
1992 singles
1996 singles
A&M Records singles
CBS Records singles
Dina Carroll songs
First Avenue Records singles
Margaret Urlich songs
Mercury Records singles
Number-one singles in New Zealand
Pop ballads
Songs written by Barry Blue
Songs written by Robyn Smith (record producer)